A Teba jacket is a soft, single-breasted jacket, unpadded throughout the chest and shoulders, and featuring shirt-like sleeves, ventless backs, notchless lapels and patch pockets with flaps. It generally has four front buttons, either in leather or nacre. Tebas are made in many fabrics, but the most common are wool, cashmere and linen.

There are several ways in which the jacket's buttons should be fastened when worn, but the bottom one should always remain undone. For example, it is possible to fasten the top three, the second and third, or only the second.

Origins

It was originally designed as a shooting blazer that would not make it difficult to raise the elbow when firing. Contrary to common misconception that it was first tailored in Savile Row, the jacket was born in a small tailor shop in Zarautz, Spain, and was named after the 21st Count of Teba, Carlos Alfonso Mitjans y Fitz-James Stuart, who later gifted Alfonso XIII with one during a partridge driven hunt in Spain. The lady tailor in question, María Sorreluz Múgica, was commissioned by Teba to design a soft and comfortable yet elegant jacket for him to use at the pigeon-shooting in Igeldo and Zarautz, where he spent his summers.

The Teba jacket has since been used not only as the utmost iconic piece of Spanish countrywear, but also as a city outfit due to its popularity throughout the world. From the beginning, Teba jackets developed a strong association with the aristocratic land-owning upper classes.

A navy linen Teba was worn by Timothy Dalton as James Bond in the 1989 film Licence to Kill, in a scene where Bond resigns in Key West and becomes a rogue agent.

Gallery

See also
British country clothing
Camisería Burgos

References

Bibliography
 
 

1920s fashion
Lounge jackets
History of clothing (Western fashion)